The American Journal of Geriatric Psychiatry is a quarterly peer-reviewed medical journal covering geriatric psychiatry. It was established in 1993 and is published by Elsevier on behalf of the American Association for Geriatric Psychiatry. The editor-in-chief is Charles F. Reynolds, III (University of Pittsburgh Medical Center). According to the Journal Citation Reports, the journal has a 2014 impact factor of 4.235.

References

External links

Elsevier academic journals
Publications established in 1993
Quarterly journals
English-language journals
Geriatric psychiatry
Gerontology journals